In enzymology, a GDP-6-deoxy-D-talose 4-dehydrogenase is an enzyme that catalyzes the chemical reaction

GDP-6-deoxy-D-talose + NAD(P)+  GDP-4-dehydro-6-deoxy-D-mannose + NAD(P)H + H+

The 3 substrates of this enzyme are GDP-6-deoxy-D-talose, NAD+, and NADP+, whereas its 4 products are GDP-4-dehydro-6-deoxy-D-mannose, NADH, NADPH, and H+.

This enzyme belongs to the family of oxidoreductases, specifically those acting on the CH-OH group of donor with NAD+ or NADP+ as acceptor. The systematic name of this enzyme class is GDP-6-deoxy-D-talose:NAD(P)+ 4-oxidoreductase. This enzyme is also called guanosine diphospho-6-deoxy-D-talose dehydrogenase. This enzyme participates in fructose and mannose metabolism.

References 

 

EC 1.1.1
NADPH-dependent enzymes
NADH-dependent enzymes
Enzymes of unknown structure